María Valverde Rodríguez (born 24 March 1987) is a Spanish actress.

Career
At age 16, Valverde had a major role in The Weakness of the Bolshevik, for which she won Best New Actress at the 18th Goya Awards.  Her other films include Melissa P., based on the book One Hundred Strokes of the Brush Before Bed by Melissa Panarello and Three Steps Above Heaven.

Valverde's films in English include the 2009 independent British drama film Cracks, produced by Ridley Scott and directed by his daughter, Jordan Scott, and the 2014 film Exodus: Gods and Kings playing Zipporah, directed by Ridley Scott, alongside Christian Bale, Joel Edgerton, Sigourney Weaver, and Ben Kingsley. In 2015, she played the lead in the drama Broken Horses, co-starring with Anton Yelchin.

Personal life
From 2009 to 2014 Valverde was in a relationship with the Spanish actor Mario Casas with whom she starred in three movies. In March 2017, Valverde married Venezuelan conductor Gustavo Dudamel.

Filmography

Film

Television

References

External links

 Official website of María Valverde
 

1987 births
Living people
Spanish film actresses
Actresses from Madrid
Spanish television actresses
Spanish child actresses
21st-century Spanish actresses